Ilie Greavu (19 July 1937 – 1 April 2007) was a Romanian football defender and manager.

Club career
Ilie Greavu, nicknamed Cauciuc (Rubber) because he could jump one meter and 20 centimeters high, was born 19 July 1937 in Sibiu, Romania and started to play football in 1952 at local club Progresul Sibiu, afterwards in 1955 moving at Progresul CPCS București in Divizia B. He was transferred at Rapid București where on 28 August 1957 he made his Divizia A debut in a 1–0 away loss against Energia Petroșani. He spent 14 seasons at Rapid in which he helped the club win the 1966–67 Divizia A which was the first title in the club's history, being used by coach Valentin Stănescu in 25 matches. He also won the 1957 Cupa Primăverii, reached two Cupa României finals in 1961 and 1962 which were lost in front of Arieșul Turda respectively Steaua București and won two Balkans Cup in 1964 and 1966. Greavu played 7 games and scored two goals in European competitions (including 4 games in the Inter-cities Fairs Cup), taking part in the 1967–68 European Cup campaign in which he helped Rapid eliminate Trakia Plovdiv, being eliminated by Juventus in the following round. He made his last Divizia A appearance on 5 June 1971 in a 3–1 home loss against Steagul Roșu Brașov, having a total of 294 appearances and one goal scored in the competition. After retirement, Greavu worked at Rapid București as vice-president from 1972 until 1974, head and second coach of the senior team, coach of the children's and junior center where he where he taught and formed generations of players, which include Stelian Marin, Ion Ion, Iosif Damaschin, Marian Rada and Daniel Niculae. In 2004, Ilie Greavu had his legs amputated because he suffered from arthritis, also he was ill of diabetes and died on 1 April 2007 at age 69 of a heart attack.

International career
Ilie Greavu played 10 matches for Romania, making his debut on 14 May 1961 under coach Gheorghe Popescu I in a friendly which ended with a 1–0 victory against Turkey. He played in six games at the 1966 World Cup qualifiers. His last appearance for the national team was on 21 September 1966 in a friendly against East Germany which ended with a 2–0 loss. He also played 12 games for Romania's Olympic team, and participated at the 1964 Summer Olympics in Tokyo where he played in all 6 games, helping the team finish in the 5th place.

Honours
Rapid București
Divizia A: 1966–67
Cupa României runner-up: 1960–61, 1961–62
Balkans Cup: 1963–64, 1964–66
Cupa Primăverii: 1957

Notes

References

1937 births
2007 deaths
Sportspeople from Sibiu
Romanian footballers
Romania international footballers
FC Progresul București players
FC Rapid București players
Liga I players
Liga II players
Olympic footballers of Romania
Footballers at the 1964 Summer Olympics
Association football defenders
Romanian football managers
FC Rapid București managers